PT Perusahaan Perdagangan Indonesia (Persero), or PPI, is the only Indonesian state-owned trading house. Its business is in export, import and distribution.

PPI was formed through the merger of three former so-called "Niaga" companies, state-owned trading companies PT Tjipta Niaga, PT Dharma Niaga and PT Pantja Niaga, on 31 March 2003.

These three ex-"Niaga" belonged to the so-called "Big Five" of the colonial period of the Netherlands Indies, which were nationalized in the 1950s.

PPI's main activities is in general trading, including export, import and distribution of :
Industrial products:
Construction materials (cement, asphalt, steel products, other metal products),
Agricultural product (staples, spices, forest and fishery products),
Chemicals (fertilizers, pesticides, hazardous chemicals and pharmaceuticals),
Machinery and equipment (medical equipment, agricultural equipment, heavy equipment, vehicles).
Consumer products:
Product of various brands, in particular Unilever),
Food and beverage (in particular alcoholic drinks, as official importer appointed by the Indonesian government).

PPI employs some 1,200 people and has offices all over Indonesia.

See also

 List of trading companies

Sources
http://cepiar.wordpress.com
Palm Oil Trading Indonesia

Companies based in Jakarta
Trading companies of Indonesia
Government-owned companies of Indonesia
Companies established in 2003